Lajos Májer (14 August 1956 – 11 March 1998) was a Hungarian professional footballer who played as a forward.

Career

Club career
He spent the majority of his career at Videoton, where he reached the 1985 UEFA Cup Final.

International career
Májer was capped three times for Hungary. He made his national team debut on 17 April 1976 in a friendly against Yugoslavia, a 0–0 away tie. His last cap came on 26 October 1979 in another friendly versus the United States, a 0–2 home loss.

Death
Májer, aged 41, died in a car accident on 11 March 1998.

References

External links
 

1956 births
1998 deaths
People from Sárbogárd
Hungarian footballers
Association football forwards
Nemzeti Bajnokság I players
Fehérvár FC players
Győri ETO FC players
Hungary international footballers
Road incident deaths in Hungary
Sportspeople from Fejér County